McAteer is a surname. Notable people with the surname include:
Alexander McAteer (born 1964), second husband of Princess Elena of Romania
Andy McAteer (born 1961), English professional footballer
Eddie McAteer (1914–1986), nationalist politician in Northern Ireland
Ed McAteer (1926–2004), a leader of the Christian right in the United States; founder of the Religious Roundtable 
Fergus McAteer, accountant and former politician in Northern Ireland
Ian McAteer (born 1961), former gangster from Glasgow
Hugh McAteer (1917–1972), volunteer in, and leader of, the Irish Republican Army
J. Eugene McAteer (1916–1967), California politician
James McAteer (born 1978), Astrophysicist
Jason McAteer (born 1971), Irish international footballer
John McAteer (1933–1977), National Organiser of the Scottish National Party (SNP) from 1968 to 1977
Kasey McAteer (born 2001), English footballer
Mick McAteer (born 1962), Irish-British consumer campaigner (Which?, FSA, etc)
Myrtle McAteer (1878–1952), American tennis player around the turn of the 20th Century
Tom McAteer (1876–1959), Scottish footballer